The Republic of Vietnam competed as Vietnam at the 1960 Summer Olympics in Rome, Italy. Three competitors, all men, took part in five events in two sports.

Fencing

One fencer represented Vietnam in 1960.

Men's foil
 Trần Văn Xuan

Men's épée
 Trần Văn Xuan

Men's sabre
 Trần Văn Xuan

Swimming

References

External links
Official Olympic Reports

Nations at the 1960 Summer Olympics
1960
1960 in Vietnam